Bholanath Saroj is an Indian politician and member of the 17th Lok Sabha from 2019, representing Machhlishahr constituency, Uttar Pradesh. He is a member of the Bharatiya Janata Party. He had contested the election from the same seat in 2014 as a member of BSP.

References 

1961 births
Living people
India MPs 2019–present
Lok Sabha members from Uttar Pradesh
Bharatiya Janata Party politicians from Uttar Pradesh
People from Jaunpur district
Bahujan Samaj Party politicians from Uttar Pradesh